"The exception that proves the rule" is a saying whose meaning is contested. Henry Watson Fowler's Modern English Usage identifies five ways in which the phrase has been used, and each use makes some sort of reference to the role that a particular case or event takes in relation to a more general rule.

Two original meanings of the phrase are usually cited. The first, preferred by Fowler, is that the presence of an exception applying to a specific case establishes ("proves") that a general rule exists. A more explicit phrasing might be "the exception that proves the existence of the rule". Most contemporary uses of the phrase emerge from this origin, although often in a way which is closer to the idea that all rules have their exceptions. The alternative origin given is that the word "prove" is used in the archaic sense of "test". In this sense, the phrase does not mean that an exception demonstrates a rule to be true or to exist, but that it tests the rule, thereby proving its value. There is little evidence of the phrase being used in this second way.

Uses in English
Fowler's typology of uses stretches from what he sees as the "original, simple use" through to the use which is both the "most objectionable" and "unfortunately the commonest". Fowler, following a prescriptive approach, understood this typology as moving from a more correct to a less correct use. However under a more descriptive approach, such distinctions in terms of accuracy would be less useful.

Proving the existence of the rule

This meaning of the phrase, which for Fowler is the original and clearest meaning, is thought to have emerged from the legal phrase "exceptio probat regulam in casibus non exceptis", an argument attributed to Cicero in his defence of Lucius Cornelius Balbus. This argument states if an exception exists or has to be stated, then this exception proves that there must be some rule to which the case is an exception. The second part of Cicero's phrase, "in casibus non exceptis" or "in cases not excepted," is almost always missing from modern uses of the statement that "the exception proves the rule".

Consider the following example of the original meaning:

In other words, under this meaning of the phrase, the exception proves that the rule exists on other occasions. This meaning of the phrase, outside of a legal setting, can describe inferences taken from signs, statements or other information. For example, the inference in a shop from a sign saying "pre-paid delivery required for refrigerators" would be that pre-paid delivery is not required for other objects. In this case, the exception of refrigerators proves the existence of a rule that pre-paid delivery is not required.

The English phrase was used this way in early citations from the seventeenth and eighteenth centuries.

Proving the validity of a rule of thumb
"The exception that proves the rule" is often used to describe a case (the exception) which serves to highlight or confirm (prove) a rule to which the exception itself is apparently contrary. Fowler describes two versions of this use, one being the "loose rhetorical sense" and the other "serious nonsense"; other writers connect these uses together insofar as they represent what Holton calls a "drift" from the legal meaning. In its more rhetorical sense, this variant of the phrase describes an exception which reveals a tendency that might have otherwise gone unnoticed. In other words, the presence of the exception serves to remind and perhaps reveal to us the rule that otherwise applies; the word 'proof' here is thus not to be taken literally.

In many uses of the phrase, however, the existence of an exception is taken to more definitively 'prove' a rule to which the exception does not fit. Under this sense it is "the unusualness of the exception" which proves how prevalent the tendency or rule of thumb to which it runs contrary is. For example: a rural village is "always" quiet. A local farmer rents his fields to a rock festival, which disturbs the quiet. In this example, saying "the exception proves the rule" is in a literal sense incorrect, as the exception shows (first) that the belief is not a rule and (second) there is no 'proof' involved. However, the phrase draws attention to the rarity of the exception, and in so doing establishes the general accuracy of the rule. In what Fowler describes as the "most objectionable" variation of the phrase, this sort of use comes closest to meaning "there is an exception to every rule", or even that the presence of an exception makes a rule more true; these uses Fowler attributes to misunderstanding.

The Oxford English Dictionary includes this meaning in its entry for the word exception, citing the example from Benjamin Jowett's 1855 book Essays, in which he writes: "We may except one solitary instance (an exception which eminently proves the rule)." Here, the existence of an exception seems to strengthen the belief of the prevalence of the rule.

Scientific sense
Under this version of the phrase, the word 'proof' is to be understood in its archaic form to mean the word 'test' (this use can be seen in the phrase the proof of the pudding is in the eating). Fowler's example is of a hypothetical critic, Jones, who never writes a favourable review. So it is surprising when we receive an exception: a favourable review by Jones of a novel by an unknown author. Then it is discovered that the novel is his own, written under a pseudonym. The exception tested ('proved') the rule and found that it needed to be understood a little more precisely - namely, that Jones will never write a favourable review, except of his own work. The previous evaluation of Jones's ill-nature toward others is re-affirmed by discovering the manner in which the exception falls outside the rule. 

Holton argues that this origin involves a "once-heard etymology" which "makes no sense of the way in which the expression is used". Others agree that most uses of the term do not correspond to this format.  Nonetheless, it does for Fowler pass the test of making grammatical sense and it is also referenced as a possible meaning within the Oxford English Dictionary.

In any case, the phrase can be interpreted as a jocular expression of the correct insight that a single counterexample, while sufficient to disprove a strictly logical statement, does not disprove statistical statements which may correctly express a general trend notwithstanding the also commonly encountered existence of a few outliers to this trend.

Humorous use
Fowler describes this use as "jocular nonsense". He presents the exchange: 'If there is one virtue I can claim, it is punctuality.' 'Were you in time for breakfast this morning?' 'Well, well, the exception that proves the rule.' In this case, the speakers are aware that the phrase does not correctly apply, but are appealing to it ironically.

See also

 Bending the rules
 Counterexample
 Extrapolation
 Expressio unius est exclusio alterius "the express mention of one thing excludes all others" [principle in statutory interpretation]
 Falsifiability
 Moving the goalposts
 Out of left field
 Presupposition
 Reductio ad absurdum
 The proof of the pudding
 All models are wrong
 Elephant in Cairo
 No true Scotsman
 Occam's razor

References

External links

The Straight Dope 
Pertinent entry of the alt.english.usage FAQ
World Wide Words
The Phrase Finder

English-language idioms
Legal idioms
Cognitive inertia
Political concepts